Statistics of Swedish football Division 2 for the 1972 season.

League standings

Norra

Mellersta

Södra

Footnotes

References
Sweden - List of final tables (Clas Glenning)

Swedish Football Division 2 seasons
2
Sweden
Sweden